The inferior nasal concha (inferior turbinated bone or inferior turbinal/turbinate) is one of the three paired nasal conchae in the nose. It extends horizontally along the lateral wall of the nasal cavity and consists of a lamina of spongy bone, curled upon itself like a scroll, (turbinate meaning inverted cone).  The inferior nasal conchae are considered a pair of facial bones. As the air passes through the turbinates, the air is churned against these mucosa-lined bones in order to receive warmth, moisture and cleansing. Superior to inferior nasal concha are the middle nasal concha and superior nasal concha which both arise from the ethmoid bone, of the cranial portion of the skull. Hence, these two are considered as a part of the cranial bones.

It has two surfaces, two borders, and two extremities.

Structure

Surfaces
The medial surface is convex, perforated by numerous apertures, and traversed by longitudinal grooves for the lodgement of vessels.

The lateral surface is concave, and forms part of the inferior meatus.

Borders
Its upper border is thin, irregular, and connected to various bones along the lateral wall of the nasal cavity.

It may be divided into three portions: of these,
 the anterior articulates with the conchal crest of the maxilla;
 the posterior with the conchal crest of the palatine;
 the middle portion presents three well-marked processes, which vary much in their size and form.
 Of these, the anterior or lacrimal process is small and pointed and is situated at the junction of the anterior fourth with the posterior three-fourths of the bone: it articulates, by its apex, with the descending process of the lacrimal bone, and, by its margins, with the groove on the back of the frontal process of the maxilla, and thus assists in forming the canal for the nasolacrimal duct.
 Behind this process a broad, thin plate, the ethmoidal process, ascends to join the uncinate process of the ethmoid; from its lower border a thin lamina, the maxillary process, curves downward and lateralward; it articulates with the maxilla and forms a part of the medial wall of the maxillary sinus.

The inferior border is free, thick, and cellular in structure, more especially in the middle of the bone.

Extremities
Both extremities are more or less pointed, the posterior being the more tapering.

Development
The inferior nasal concha is ossified from a single center, which appears about the fifth month of fetal life in the lateral wall of the cartilaginous nasal capsule.

Additional images

See also

 Empty nose syndrome
 Nasal concha

References

External links

 
 

Bones of the head and neck